Noir is the second studio album by William Control.  It was released on June 8, 2010, and the only single, released a day after the album, was I'm Only Human Sometimes (which live performances have been ended with for some years now).  This was accompanied by a music video, with both clean and uncensored versions available.  The single's cover was rejected by online music retailer iTunes, who considered it 'unsuitable for minors'.  Noir was written, produced and engineered by William Control, and recorded at Sleepy Hollow Studios, then mixed by Justin Armstrong and William Control at Robert Lang Studios in Seattle.

Track listing

Trivia
 The title of track 1 is French for 'an announcement' while the title of track 2 is German for 'prelude'.
 Track 4 contains references to the novel and film Let The Right One In.
 Track 9 is about The Picture of Dorian Gray and is told from the perspective of its lead character.
 Track 5 is a cover of Can't Help Falling In Love by Elvis Presley.
 Album pre-order packages contained a pair of unisex briefs branded with the William Control logo.
 Scylla and Charybdis are monsters from Greek mythology, representing having to choose between 2 equally dangerous situations.

Credits
 Photography: Lisa Johnson
 Art direction: DoubleJ
 Assistant engineers: Bob Bicknell, John Troxell, Jason Weiner and Brian San Marco

References

2010 albums
William Control albums
Victory Records albums
Albums recorded at Robert Lang Studios